Connally Findlay Trigg (March 8, 1810 – April 25, 1880) was a United States district judge of the United States District Court for the Eastern District of Tennessee, the United States District Court for the Middle District of Tennessee and the United States District Court for the Western District of Tennessee.

Education and career

Born on March 8, 1810, in Abingdon, Virginia, Trigg read law in 1833. He entered private practice in Abingdon until 1856. He was a town councilman for Abingdon starting in 1835. He was clerk of the Washington County, Virginia Court from 1838 to 1852. Trigg was elected to the Virginia Constitutional Convention of 1850, one of four chosen for the delegate district including his home Washington County and Smyth and Wythe Counties. A Whig, he ran for the United States House of Representatives in 1855, but was defeated by the Democratic incumbent, Fayette McMullen. He continued private practice in Knoxville, Tennessee from 1856 to 1861. From 1856 to 1861, he was in partnership with Oliver Perry Temple.

Unionist

Trigg largely avoided Knoxville politics until the secession crisis intensified in the weeks following the election of President Abraham Lincoln. During this crisis, Trigg remained a steadfast supporter of the Union. In February 1861, he was one of Knox County's pro-Union candidates for the proposed statewide secession convention (voters ultimately rejected holding the convention). In May and June 1861, he was one of Knox's delegates to the Unionist East Tennessee Convention. He served as Chairman of the convention's business committee, which was tasked with drafting a set of grievances and resolutions.

Federal judicial service

Trigg was nominated by President Abraham Lincoln on July 16, 1862, to a joint seat on the United States District Court for the Eastern District of Tennessee, the United States District Court for the Middle District of Tennessee and the United States District Court for the Western District of Tennessee vacated by Judge West Hughes Humphreys, who had been removed from office by the United States Senate on June 26, 1862, for siding with the Confederate States of America. He was confirmed by the United States Senate on July 17, 1862, and received his commission the same day. He was reassigned to serve only in the Eastern District and Middle District on June 14, 1878. His service terminated on April 25, 1880, due to his death in Bristol, Tennessee.

References

Sources
 
 

1810 births
1880 deaths
Judges of the United States District Court for the Western District of Tennessee
Judges of the United States District Court for the Middle District of Tennessee
Judges of the United States District Court for the Eastern District of Tennessee
United States federal judges appointed by Abraham Lincoln
19th-century American judges
Southern Unionists in the American Civil War
19th-century American politicians
United States federal judges admitted to the practice of law by reading law